Chapelhow is a surname. Notable people with the surname include:

Harry Chapelhow (1886–1957), English footballer
James Chapelhow (born 1995), English rugby league player